The BDO International Open was an darts tournament that has been held annually since 2008.

List of tournaments

Men's

Boys

Tournament records
 Most wins 2:  Martin Adams. 
 Most Finals 2:  Martin Adams,  Tony O'Shea. 
 Most Semi Finals 2:  Martin Adams,  Tony O'Shea,  Garry Thompson,  Mark Barilli
 Most Quarter Finals 4:  Scott Mitchell.
 Most Appearances 7:  Martin Adams,  Ross Montgomery,  Scott Mitchell,  Gary Robson.
 Most Prize Money won £6,150:  Martin Adams.
 Best winning average : v.
 Youngest Winner age 22:   Jan Dekker. 
 Oldest Winner age 58:  Martin Adams.

References

External links

2008 establishments in the United Kingdom
2019 disestablishments in the United Kingdom
British Darts Organisation tournaments